Baptistines was the name given to several Roman Catholic religious institutes dedicated to Saint John the Baptist:

 Hermits of St. John the Baptist, founded about 1630 by Michel de Saint-Sabine in France who reformed and united the hermits of various dioceses.
 Missionaries of St. John the Baptist founded by a Genoese, Domenico Olivieri, who united several priests with himself for the evangelization of the people of the towns and countryside.
 The Sisterhood of St. John the Baptist, or Hermit Sisters of St. John the Baptist, were founded by Giovanna Maria Baptista Solimani in 1730 at Moneglia.
 The Sisters of St. John the Baptist is a female religious institute, founded in Angri in 1876.